Gilbert Ronald Larrieu (May 23, 1937 – June 1, 2020), known as Ron Larrieu, was an American long-distance runner. He competed in the men's 10,000 metres at the 1964 Summer Olympics. He was the older brother of American five-time Olympian Francie Larrieu.

Ron ran for Palo Alto High School, winning the 1956 CIF California State Meet in the mile in 4:20.1.  He was ranked #3 in the country that year.  Earlier in the season he broke the 2 mile high school record that had stood for 31 years.  Collegiately he ran for Cal Poly Pomona.

He was a two time national champion in cross country, in 1965 and 1966.

References

External links
 

1937 births
2020 deaths
Athletes (track and field) at the 1964 Summer Olympics
American male long-distance runners
Olympic track and field athletes of the United States
Cal Poly Pomona Broncos men's track and field athletes
Cal Poly Pomona Broncos men's cross country runners
Track and field athletes from San Francisco
American masters athletes